The second Gandaki Provincial Assembly was elected by the 2022 provincial elections on 20 November 2022. 60 members were elected to the assembly, 36 of whom were elected through direct elections and 24 of whom were elected through the party list proportional representation system. The first session of the assembly commenced from 2 January 2023.

Leaders

Officers 

 Speaker of the Assembly: Hon. Krishna Prasad Dhital (CPN (Maoist Centre))
 Deputy Speaker of the Assembly: Hon. Bina Kumari Thapa (CPN (UML))
 Leader of the House (Chief Minister): Hon. Khagaraj Adhikari (CPN (UML))
 Leader of the Opposition: Surendra Raj Pandey (Nepali Congress)

Parliamentary party 

 Parliamentary party leader of Nepali Congress: Hon. Surendra Raj Pandey
 Parliamentary party leader of CPN (UML): Hon. Khagaraj Adhikari
 Parliamentary party leader of CPN (Maoist Centre): Hon. Hari Bahadur Chuman
 Parliamentary party leader of Rastriya Prajatantra Party: Hon. Pancharam Gurung

Whip 

 Chief Whip of CPN (UML): Hon. Roshan Bahadur Gaha Thapa

Composition

Members

Party changes or defections

See also 

 Gandaki Province

References

External links 

 समानुपातिक निर्वाचन प्रणाली तर्फको गण्डकी प्रदेश सभामा निर्वाचित सदस्यहरुको विवरण

Members of the Provincial Assembly of Gandaki Province